Philip Palmer is a British novelist and screenwriter.

Philip Palmer may also refer to:
 Philip Palmer (priest), Anglican priest
 Philip Jonathan Gbagu Palmer, Sierra Leonean diplomat
 Phil Palmer, guitarist
 C. Phil Palmer, palaeontologist

See also
 Philip Palmer Green, theoretical and computational biologist